The 1904–05 United States collegiate men's ice hockey season was the 11th season of collegiate ice hockey. 

Due to a lack of ice facilities, many programs were suspended starting in 1904. The schools to cease their ice hockey teams include Cornell University, Rensselaer Polytechnic Institute, Union College and Williams College. Most would eventually restart their programs.

Regular season

Standings

References

1904–05 NCAA Standings

External links
College Hockey Historical Archives

 
College